Attorney General Webb may refer to:

Clifton Webb (politician) (1889–1962), Attorney General of New Zealand
James Webb (Texas politician) (1792–1856), Attorney General of the Republic of Texas
Ulysses S. Webb (1864–1947), Attorney General of California

See also
General Webb (disambiguation)